Il sogno eretico (translatable as "The Heretical Dream") is the fifth studio album by the Italian rapper Caparezza, released on March 1, 2011. The title of the album contains a pun: in Italian "eretico" sounds like "erotico" (erotic), so that the reader thinks about a kind of parody of "The erotic dream".

The album debuts at the second place of official Italian charts, FIMI.

Reception 

Allmusic reviewer Mariano Prunes wrote, "CapaRezza continues to defy classification with his fascinating cross-contamination of styles".

Track listing 
 "Nessun dorma"
 "Tutti dormano"
 "Chi se ne frega della musica"
 "Il dito medio di Galileo"
 "Sono il tuo sogno eretico"
 "Cose che non capisco"
 "Goodbye Malinconia" (feat. Tony Hadley)
 "La marchetta di Popolino"
 "La fine di Gaia"
 "House Credibility"
 "Kevin Spacey"
 "Legalize the Premier" (feat. Alborosie)
 "Messa in moto"
 "Non siete Stato voi"
 "La ghigliottina"
 "Ti sorrido mentre affogo"

Certifications

Bonus tracks 
 "Lottavo, capitolo"
 "Ti sorrido mentre affogo (video)"

References

2011 albums
Caparezza albums